Leaflet may refer to:
 Leaflet (botany), part of a compound leaf
 Leaflet (software), a JavaScript library for interactive maps
 Pamphlet, a type of publication
 Folded leaflet
 Flyer (pamphlet)
 Airborne leaflet propaganda
 Cusps of heart valves, also known as leaflets
 Any of two layers of lipid bilayer, including biological membrane